Naval Striking and Support Forces NATO (STRIKFORNATO) is the principal naval service command of the North Atlantic Treaty Organization's (NATO) Allied Command Operations (ACO), replacing Naval Striking and Support Forces Southern Europe (STRIKFORSOUTH). STRIKFORNATO is commanded by Commander United States Sixth Fleet, and it is the only command capable of leading an expanded maritime task force.

History

Naval Striking and Support Forces Southern Europe (STRIKFORSOUTH)
In December 1952, Commander-in-Chief, Allied Forces Southern Europe (CINCSOUTH) ordered the establishment of a new command titled, Commander, Naval Striking and Support Forces Southern Europe as a principal subordinate commander under CINCSOUTH.

The command was a dual assignment for the vice admiral commanding the U.S. Sixth Fleet. The STRIKFORSOUTH staff was initially composed principally of U.S. Navy personnel because forces earmarked for STRIKFORSOUTH were from the U.S. Other allied personnel from France, Greece, Italy, Turkey, and the United Kingdom came on board to better mesh with other Mediterranean NATO commanders in planning and conducting exercises and training. Its area of responsibility (AOR) was the entire Mediterranean theater, from the Straits of Gibraltar to the Easter Mediterranean and Black Sea.

In 1953 the command set up shore spaces at the NATO AFSOUTH complex in the Neapolitan neighborhood of Bagnoli which had been one of the Fascist regime's public housing architectural showcases. Its staff occupied the top floor of one of the four main subordinate buildings on the main quadrangle.

Throughout the Cold War, STRIKFORSOUTH was the command most likely to deal with any sudden emergencies in the Southern Region. In charge of NATO Carrier Aviation and amphibious forces, its primary mission in all out war would be to participate in NATO's counter-offensive by launching deep conventional air attacks or close air support missions in conjunction with any amphibious operations. As the Soviet naval build-up in the Mediterranean progressed through the 1960s and 1970s, STRIKFORSOUTH served as a major advisor to Allied Forces Southern Europe (AFSOUTH) and Supreme Headquarters Allied Powers Europe (SHAPE) in the area of Nuclear Strike Planning. The command honed its readiness through these years by planning and conducting semi-annual large-scale NATO amphibious exercises as well as numerous small-scale exercises in various disciplines.

STRIKFORSOUTH coordinated NATO support for the security of the lines of supply through the Mediterranean for Coalition forces during Operations DESERT SHIELD/DESERT STORM in 1990 and 1991. 
The end of the Cold War failed to end STRIKFORSOUTH's mission as the threat from the Soviet Union was replaced by threats from civil and ethnic wars in the Balkans, Middle East and on the African continent.  As a result, STRIKFORSOUTH was directly responsible in developing and refining the Multinational Amphibious Task Force (MNATF) concept. 

The conflict in the Balkans saw STRIKFORSOUTH contributing  planning support and liaison officers to AFSOUTH operations. This led to the establishment of the Kosovo Verification Coordination Centre in the former Yugoslavia Republic of Macedonia by STRIKFORSOUTH personnel. COMSTRIKFORSOUTH assumed command of NATO Carrier Forces during Operation ALLIED FORCE.

STRIKFORNATO

Exercise Trident Juncture 2018

From 25 October to 7 November 2018, STRIKFORNATO deployed on board USS Mount Whitney—Afloat Command Platform (ACP) of STRIKFORNATO—and performed in its role as a NATO Expanded Task Force (NETF) providing command and control of multiple strike groups which included II Marine Expeditionary Force (II MEF), 2nd Marine Expeditionary Brigade (2nd MEB), 24th Marine Expeditionary Unit (24th MEU), Expeditionary Strike Group 2 (ESG 2), a Canadian/British Surface Action Group, a Norwegian Surface Action Group and mine countermeasures assets, a Norwegian submarine, and Carrier Strike Group 8 USS Harry S. Truman for a limited duration of exercise control. STRIKFORNATO commanded more than 20 ships operating in the North and Norwegian seas and troops ashore in Norway. This exercise "tests NATO's collective response to an armed attack against one ally, invoking Article 5 of the North Atlantic Treaty" which states that "an armed attack against one or more of [the Parties] in Europe or North America shall be considered an attack against them all."

List of commanders

COMSTRIKFORSOUTH 50th Anniversary (1953-2003)
15 March 1953 – 6 March 1954 VADM John H. Cassady
6 March 1954 – 25 March 1955 VADM Thomas S. Combs
26 March 1955 – 1 April 1956 VADM Ralph A. Ofstie
2 April 1956 – 3 August 1956 VADM Harry D. Felt
4 August 1956 – 29 September 1958 VADM Charles R. Brown
30 September 1958 – 13 September 1959 VADM Clarence E. Ekstrom
14 September 1959 – 12 July 1961 VADM George W. Anderson
13 July 1961 – 17 March 1963 VADM David L. McDonald
18 March 1963 – 1 June 1964 VADM William E. Gentner
2 June 1964 – 9 May 1966 VADM William E. Ellis
10 May 1966 – 4 April 1967 VADM Frederick L. Ashworth
5 April 1967 – 13 August 1968 VADM William I. Martin
14 August 1968 – 27 August 1970 VADM David C. Richardson
28 August 1970 – 19 September 1971 VADM Isaac C. Kidd
20 September 1971 – 10 June 1973 VADM Gerald E. Miller
11 June 1973 – September 1974 VADM Daniel J. Murphy
September 1974 – August 1976 VADM Frederick C. Turner
August 1976 – September 1978 VADM Harry D. Train
September 1978 – July 1979 VADM James D. Watkins
July 1979 – June 1981 VADM William N. Small
June 1981 – June 1983 VADM William H. Rowden
July 1983 – February 1985 VADM Edward H. Martin
February 1985 – June 1986 VADM Frank B. Kelso, II
June 1986 – August 1988 VADM Kendall E. Moranville 
1 August 1988 – November 1990 VADM James D. Williams
November 1990 – July 1992 VADM William A. Owens
July 1992 – December 1993 VADM Thomas J. Lopez
December 1993 – March 1995 VADM Joseph W. Prueher
March 1995 – 11 July 1996 VADM Donald L. Pilling
12 July 1996 – July 1998 VADM Charles S. Abbot
July 1998 – 28 September 2000 VADM Daniel J. Murphy, Jr.
29 September 2000 – 22 October 2001 VADM Gregory G. Johnson
23 October 2001 – 4 November 2003 VADM Scott A. Fry

COMSTRIKFORNATO (2004–present)
5 November 2003 – 9 May 2005 VADM Henry G. Ulrich III
10 May 2005 – 6 June 2005 RADM David J. Cooke MBE
7 June 2005 – 20 September 2007 VADM John D. Stufflebeem
21 September 2007 – 10 August 2008 VADM James A. Winnefeld Jr.
11 August 2008 – 19 November 2009 VADM Bruce W. Clingan
20 November 2009 – 3 October 2011 VADM Harry B. Harris, Jr.
4 October 2011 – 8 October 2013 VADM Frank C. Pandolfe
8 October 2013 – 14 December 2014 VADM Philip S. Davidson
14 December 2014 – 28 October 2016 VADM James G. Foggo
28 October 2016 – 1 March 2018 VADM Christopher W. Grady
1 March 2018 – 1 July 2020 VADM Lisa M. Franchetti
1 July 2020 – September 2022 VADM Eugene H. Black III
1 September 2022 – Present VADM Thomas Ishee

Notes

Further reading

External links
 Official web site

Naval warfare
Military units and formations of NATO
Military units and formations established in 2004
Military installations in Portugal
Portugal and NATO